Sole may refer to:
 Sole (foot), the bottom of the foot
 Sole (shoe), the bottom supporting member of the shoe

Business
 Sole proprietorship, a business which legally has no separate existence from its owner
 Corporation sole, in English law, a legal entity consisting of a single person ("sole")
 Sole Technology, an American footwear company specializing in skateboarding shoes

Fish
 Sole (fish), one of several species and groups of flatfishes:
 Soleidae, the family of the "true soles" 
 Solea solea, the common or Dover sole, used in European cooking
 American sole, the family Achiridae
 Tonguefish, or tongue sole, in the family Cynoglossidae
 Several species of righteye flounder in the family Pleuronectidae:
 Lemon sole
 Microstomus pacificus (Pacific Dover sole)

People
 Solé (surname), a French and Spanish surname
 Sole (hip hop artist) (born 1977), hip-hop emcee and co-founder of the Anticon record label
 Solé (born 1973), American rapper and former wife of R&B singer Ginuwine
 Alfred Sole (1943-2022), American production designer, film director, producer, and writer
 Josh Sole (born 1980), New Zealand born rugby union player
 Paul Soles (1930-2021), Canadian voice actor

Other uses
 Sole (currency), a 19th-century Argentine and Bolivian currency
 European Liberal Social Democracy, a defunct political party in Italy
 Sole Bank, a sand bank in the Atlantic Ocean to the southwest of Cornwall, England, giving its name to the Sole sea area in the Shipping Forecast
 Sun (film), a 1929 silent Italian film directed
 Sole, the flat bottom part of plane that slides along the workpiece
 Sole, a part of a tool such as a spokeshave

See also
 Sol (disambiguation)
 Sola (disambiguation)
 Soul (disambiguation)
 Soules, a surname